The Hadith of the Twelve Successors is a widely-reported prophecy, attributed to the Islamic prophet Muhammad, predicting that there would be twelve successors after him. As there were many more rulers after Muhammad, Sunni authors have variously identified these twelve successors with some of these rulers. In Twelver Shia, these successors are instead the Twelve Imams. The last one, Muhammad al-Mahdi, is believed to be in occultation since 874 CE. While the details vary, the belief in the eschatological Mahdi remains popular among all Muslims, possibly owing to numerous traditions to this effect in canonical Sunni and Shia sources.

Sunni sources

Narration 
Several similar variants of the tradition exists in Sunni sources, usually related on the authority of Muhammad's companion Jabir ibn Samura, but also by other companions, such as Abd Allah ibn Mas'ud, Anas ibn Malik, Umar, Wa'ila ibn Asqa', Abd Allah ibn Umar, Abu Huraira, Salman the Persian, Aisha, and Uthman. The version in the canonical Sahih al-Bukhari and Sahih Muslim quotes Muhammad,

This version is also cited by Na'im ibn Hammad, al-Tirmidhi, Ibn Asakir, to name a few. In particular, Ahmad ibn Hanbal narrates it with thirty-four chains of transmitters, all of which are on the authority of Jabir ibn Samura.

Other versions 
The version cited by Abu Dawud adds that the Islamic community would be united during the reign of these twelve successors. Another version predicts that anarchy and turmoil would prevail after their reign. Another version compares these twelve successors to the twelve leaders of Banu Israil. Modarressi argues that this hadith was in circulation during the reign of the Umayyad Hisham ibn Abd al-Malik, long before the reported occultation of the twelfth and final Shia Imam Muhammad al-Mahdi in 260/874.

Identification with the caliphs 
In his commentary on Sahih al-Bukhari, al-Qastallani suggests that the hadith refers to twelve (non-consecutive) Muslim rulers, whose relatively stable reign was followed by the unstable rule of al-Walid II. Though he does not name them, he is likely referring to the four Rashidun caliphs, Mu'awiya I and his son Yazid I, Abd al-Malik and his four sons, and Umar II, according to Kohlberg. His second proposal is that the hadith refers to twelve concurrent claimants to the caliphate who, he claims, competed in the fifth/eleventh century. His third proposal is that the hadith refers to the golden age of Islam that ended with the death of Umar II in 101/720. This means fourteen rulers, rather than twelve. So al-Qastallani removes Mu'awiya II and Marwan I, saying that their reigns were too short. He does, however, retain Hasan ibn Ali. 

Al-Nawawi gives a similar explanation in his commentary on Sahih Muslim. With an anti-Umayyad attitude, al-Fadl ibn Ruzbihan (tenth/sixteenth century) instead identifies the twelve successors as the "five" (rather than four) Rashidun caliphs, Abd Allah ibn al-Zubayr, Umar II, and five Abbasid caliphs whom he does not name.

Twelver sources

Before occultation 
Perhaps the earliest Shia versions of this hadith appear in the Kitab Sulaym ibn Qays, attributed to Sulaym ibn Qays, who might have been a companion of Ali. One version therein is related on the authority of Ali, Abd Allah ibn Ja'far, and Salman the Persian, among others. Shortly before he died in 11/632, Muhammad is reported to have told his companions at Ghadir Khumm,

Neglect 
Sulaym's statement did not garner much attraction until the late third/ninth century among Imamites, who went on to form the Twelver community after the occultation of their twelfth Imam in 260/874. In particular, this hadith is absent from the works of the contemporary Imamite Muhammad ibn al-Haan al-Saffar, Sa'd ibn Abd Allah al-Ash'ari, and Ibn Qiba. This was the case, Modarressi argues, because the Imamite community in the first decades of the occultation likely expected their twelfth Imam to reemerge soon and the line of the Imams to continue as before. It was probably sometime after 295/908 that the community realized that there might not be a manifest Imam for the foreseeable future, Modarressi writes. Only then the number of Imams became a central issue.

After occultation 
Al-Kulayni and Ibn Babawahy are among the first Imamite traditionists who include in their works such hadiths that set the number of the Imams at twelve. In particular, al-Kulayni has a chapter in his canonical Kitab al-Kafi about the number of Imams. As for Sulaym's hadith above, al-Kulayni, al-Nu'mani, and al-Tusi all cite it while al-Mas'udi questions its authenticity.

Another version of the hadith, cited by Ibn Babawahy on the authority of Ali, identifies the twelfth successor as Muhammad al-Mahdi, who is often referred to as al-Qa'im in the Twelver hadith literature. This version ascribes to Muhammad,

Identification with the Twelve Imams 
Noting that there have been many more (temporal) rulers after Muhammad, the Twelver authors identify the twelve successors in this hadith with their Twelve Imams. The Twelver Sobhani adds that the dignity of Islam rests on these twelve successors, and this alone disqualifies the Umayyad and Abbasid caliphs, in his view. As for Mahdi, the belief in this eschatological figure remains popular among all Muslims, possibly owing to numerous traditions to this effect in canonical Sunni and Shia sources.

Zaydi sources 
Variants of this hadith also appear in Zaydi Shia sources. Abu Sa'id Abbad al-Asfari quotes Muhammad in his Kitab Akhbar al- Mahdi,

See also
 List of hadiths
 Mahdi
 Muhammad al-Mahdi
 At-Tayyib Abu'l-Qasim

References

Sources 

 
 
 
 
 
 

Hadith